Helmut Schlesinger (born 4 September 1924 in Penzberg) is a German economist and former President of the Bundesbank.

Education
After his military duty, he studied economics at the University of Munich, from where he graduated with a Diplom in 1948, and with a Dr. oec. in economics in 1951.

Career
He entered the German Central Bank in 1952 and ascended rapidly to the position of a department head. In 1964, he was appointed Director of Economics and Statistics, and became a member of the executive board in 1972. He served as deputy chairman from 1980 to 1991 and as President of the German Central Bank from 1991 to 1993. Schlesinger has been a distinguished honorary professor at the German University of Administrative Sciences. He is currently an advisor to IDEAglobal Group, a global financial research organisation.

Awards
He is a member of the Orders of Merit and of Chivalry of Germany, Italy, Austria, Hungary, Sweden, and Luxembourg.

References

1924 births
Living people
German economists
Grand Crosses 1st class of the Order of Merit of the Federal Republic of Germany
German chief executives
Presidents of the Deutsche Bundesbank
People from Weilheim-Schongau